Charles King Irwin, D.D. (18 July 1837–3 January 1915) was an eminent Irish clergyman

Biography
Irwin was educated at Trinity College, Oxford  and ordained in 1861 After a curacy at Derrynoose he held incumbencies at Kilmore, Brantry, KeadyClonfeacle and Armagh. He was appointed Keeper of Public Library in 1913.  He became Archdeacon of Armagh in 1894.

His father, also Charles King Irwin, was Precentor of St Patrick's Cathedral, Armagh; and his son, a third Charles King Irwin, was a bishop in three dioceses.

References

1837 births
Alumni of Trinity College Dublin
Archdeacons of Armagh
19th-century Irish Anglican priests
20th-century Irish Anglican priests
1915 deaths